The 1909–10 season was the 15th competitive season in Belgian football.

Overview
Union Saint-Gilloise and F.C. Brugeois finished with the same number of points in the first division. A final game was thus organised to determine the champion, won by Union. FC Liégeois finished 12th and was relegated to the second division, and replaced by second division winner RC de Malines. Standard FC Liégeois played their first ever season in the top division of Belgian football.

National team

* Belgium score given first

Key
 H = Home match
 A = Away match
 F = Friendly

Honours

Final league tables

Division I

Promotion

External links
RSSSF archive - Final tables 1895-2002
Belgian clubs history

References

 Belgium Soccer History